Monte Porale is a mountain in Liguria, northern Italy, part of the Ligurian Apennines.

References

Mountains of Liguria
Mountains under 1000 metres
Mountains of the Apennines